Marko Simović (born 19 February 1987) is a Montenegrin handball player for Romanian handball team SCM Politehnica Timișoara and the Montenegrin national team.

References

1987 births
Living people
Montenegrin male handball players
Sportspeople from Cetinje
Montenegrin expatriate sportspeople in Romania
Expatriate handball players